Ie Meulee is a village (kelurahan) in Sukajaya sub-district, Sabang, Aceh, Indonesia. Ie Meulee in Acehnese means 'Tapak Gajah' which comes from the discovery of an inscription with elephant treads in this village. This gampong is the northernmost settlement in the territory of Indonesia, with the population, most of whom work as fishermen. This village has several tourist attractions, namely Sumur Tiga Beach which has clear water. and Tapak Gajah Beach, which has historical heritage in the form of a Japanese fort.

References

Populated places in Aceh